The 2000–01 Saint Joseph's Hawks men's basketball team represented Saint Joseph's University during the 2000–01 NCAA Division I men's basketball season. Under 6th year head coach Phil Martelli, the Hawks held an overall record of 26–7 and a conference record of 14–2. In the A-10 tournament, Saint Joseph's beat La Salle before falling to UMass in the semifinals. The Hawks earned an at-large bid to the NCAA tournament – as No. 9 seed in the West region – where they beat No. 8 seed  in the opening round before falling to No. 1 seed Stanford in the round of 32.

Roster

Schedule and results

|-
!colspan=9 style=| Regular Season

|-
!colspan=9 style=| Atlantic 10 Tournament

|-
!colspan=9 style=| NCAA Tournament

Rankings

References

Saint Joseph's
Saint Joseph's
Saint Joseph's Hawks men's basketball seasons